The Battle of Cixi (no relation to the reigning Empress at the time) or Battle of Tzeki (慈溪之戰) was a victory for Qing imperial forces led by American soldier of fortune Frederick Townsend Ward against Taiping Rebels in late Qing dynasty China.  By 1862 Ward, who recently scored several victories for the imperial forces, had raised an army for the defense of Shanghai.  On 20 September he attacked the walled city of Cixi (Tzeki) ten miles outside Ningbo.  During the attack Ward was mortally wounded but remained in the field until victory was assured.  He died the next day and command of his army: British COL Forrester, (Ward's second in command), declined the honor to lead the Forces.

That led to Henry Burgevine, a Carolinian who took over as CO of the Command's Forces. It took many weeks before Burgevine would take to the field. He drank a lot at night, he was certainly confronted by the huge task before him, and it was truly much greater than he could bear. Burgevine did not get along well with the other senior leaders, however he tried his best and did lead the forces out, but circumstances overwhelmed him. The Russians tried to interfere, sensing perhaps a vacuum was occurring in China, and their forces might intercede. That was quashed by the British Forces and financial interests that funded the Ever Victorious Army. Burgevine struggled under the difficulty of taking over from a personality such as General Ward. Burgvine found himself thrust into a leadership position, and had no one like Ward to lean upon, and he himself realized he was intellectually ill-suited for the task at hand.

Burgevine was no Ward, however he took over leadership, but his personal behavior and temperament was in conflict with the good order and discipline necessary to lead a mixed group of mercenary forces in this ever-changing war. It was unlike any other Civil War the world had ever experienced! Even to this day and time. His uncouth behaviour got him into great deal of trouble, as he could not lead as Ward had led the Ever Victorious Army (EVA) throughout all previous Battles. logistics. Arguments with late pay created a situation in which he used force to get the money the forces needed, and that developed into an international incident which blew up tremendously and led to the leadership being taken over by the British, which led to the group being re-formed under new leadership by a British Major Charles G. Gordon (Chinese Gordon).

Background

When Shanghai was successively attacked by Taiping Rebels in 1862, western inhabitants favored removing the potential threat and cooperating with imperial forces; as a result, combined British and French naval troops under the command of Adm. James Hope were involved in military conflict with the Taiping Rebellion.  One of the communities inhabited by the rebels was Ningbo, a port and walled city located south of Hangzhou Bay.

The imperial army laid siege to Ningbo's occupiers on 6 May.  After a false flag attack on the British ships docked outside Ningbo, the western ships began bombarding the Taiping. They then sent their crews into the city, overpowering rebel forces and turning over Ningbo to the imperial army.  With Ningbo secure, Ward's soldiers and the Qing forces began launching attacks in the surrounding areas against the rebels.  During this time Cixi was one of the encircling cities ravaged by violence.

Battle
The Ever Victorious Army attacked Cixi on 20 September. As well as being trained in artillery and rifle usage, they were accompanied by the gunboats H.M.S. Hardy and Confucius. Ward led from the front and was hit in the stomach by a musket ball. However, he remained on the battlefield until victory was certain.

References

Citations

Bibliography
 Compton's Home Library: Battles of the World
Hahn Boxer, E. (1963). China Only Yesterday

Conflicts in 1862
Battles of the Taiping Rebellion
1862 in China
Military history of Zhejiang
September 1862 events